Epimedium sagittatum is a flowering plant in the barberry family (Berberidaceae) native to China. It is known locally as 三枝九叶草 and is sometimes called horny goat weed for its purported aphrodisiac properties.

References

sagittatum
Flora of China